Christiane Crane Fichtner (born October 28, 1962) is an American actress and beauty queen who won Miss USA 1986. In 2003, she participated in Who Wants to Marry My Dad?.

Early life and education
Her father is named Clifton Wales Fichtner. She attended Greenwich High School in Connecticut where she was the girlfriend of future Pro Football Hall of Famer Steve Young. She moved to Dallas, enrolling at Southern Methodist University.

Career

Pageants
As a beauty queen, she was crowned Miss Texas USA and Miss USA 1986, becoming the second of five consecutive winners from Texas during the 1980s. Her main competition and eventual first runner-up at Miss USA was actress Halle Berry.

At the 1986 Miss Universe pageant held in July 1986 in Panama City, Panama, Fichtner placed first in the preliminary competition, third in semifinal interview, first in swimsuit and second in evening gown, which allowed her to advance as one of the Top 5 finalists of the competition, finishing her participation in Miss Universe 1986 as first runner-up to eventual winner, Bárbara Palacios Teyde of Venezuela.

After Miss USA
In 2003, she starred in the reality television show Who Wants to Marry My Dad?, where she was the runner-up.

After Hurricane Wilma damaged Cancún and its infrastructure in 2005, Fichtner, a frequent traveler to the area, revisited the tourist location in an effort to promote tourism: "The Cancún we love needs to be visited by Texans in order to return to what it once was."

Personal life
A longtime Dallasite, Fichtner married Dallas dentist Gary E. Alhadef in October 1988, with whom she has 3 sons: Blake Clifton, Steven Walker and Corbin Reed. They later divorced.

References

External links
Official Miss USA website - Past titleholders

1962 births
Living people
Miss Universe 1986 contestants
Miss USA 1986 delegates
Miss USA winners
Participants in American reality television series
Actresses from Dallas
Greenwich High School alumni
Southern Methodist University alumni
20th-century American people
21st-century American women